Oakley Union Elementary School District is a public school district in Contra Costa County, California, United States.

Oakley Union oversees nine public schools, including seven elementary schools (KG–5) and two middle schools (6–8).

History
In February 2021, the entire school board for the district resigned after board members' "offensive" comments during a recorded online board meeting.

Schools

Notes

References

External links
 

School districts in Contra Costa County, California